Schiller is a German electronic music band that rose to fame in 1998 and is named after the German poet and dramatist Friedrich Schiller. Originally, it was a duo consisting of Christopher von Deylen and Mirko von Schlieffen. Around 2001 or 2002, von Schlieffen left the band, leaving von Deylen the solo member.

Schiller won the ECHO award in 2002 for the Best Dance Single of the Year with "Dream of You". Schiller has sold over 7 million albums worldwide.

Christopher von Deylen does not provide any vocals for Schiller productions himself. Vocals are sung by guest artists including Tricia McTeague, Jette von Roth, Kêta Jo McCue, Cristina Scabbia of Lacuna Coil, Sheppard Solomon, Samu Haber of Sunrise Avenue, Sarah Brightman, Moya Brennan of Clannad, Midge Ure of Ultravox, Adam Young of Owl City, Andrea Corr of The Corrs, Colbie Caillat, Sarah Howells of Welsh emotional folk / indie band Paper Aeroplanes, Ben Becker, Peter Heppner of synthpop band Wolfsheim, MiLù – also known as Mila Mar, Xavier Naidoo, Arlissa, Maya Saban, Kim Sanders formerly of Culture Beat, Ana Torroja of the Spanish pop group Mecano, Tarja Turunen formerly of power metal group Nightwish, Despina Vandi, Alexander Veljanov of Darkwave group Deine Lakaien, Swedish singer September, French voice artist Pierre Maubouché, Nena, and Meredith Call.

Other musicians that have collaborated with Schiller include Anggun, Lang Lang, Klaus Schulze, Mike Oldfield, Helen Boulding, Kate Havnevik, Pouya Saraei, Damae of Fragma, Tangerine Dream, Jaël of Swiss band Lunik, Stephenie Coker and German actress Anna Maria Mühe.

Many of Schiller's albums take over a year to receive a North American release. Until 2008 several of Schiller's tracks were re-recorded with English replacing German lyrics. The television channel Music Force Europe dedicates a weekly programming slot to Schiller's music; the show is called "Schill-Out".

Career 

Schiller started as a duo, formed by Christopher von Deylen and Mirko von Schlieffen in 1998. The first single of the band was Das Glockenspiel, with great success in Germany. This song would go on to international success when a remixed version by DJ Tiesto was released in 2001.

On 19 August 1999, their first full album, Zeitgeist, was launched. Musically, this album was a mixture of ambient trance music and ambient chillout music, as well as a few Schiller hallmarks such as an ambient, spoken-word intro track and brief German language monologues. This album was followed by Weltreise (Voyage), which was released on 30 July 2001. This album featured the single "Dream of You" (with Peter Heppner), which won the ECHO award in 2002 for the Best Dance Single of the Year.

Since Schlieffen wanted to focus mostly on trance music, while Deylen wanted a more eclectic electronica, the duo split after their second album Weltreise.

The third studio album, Leben (Life), was issued on 13 October 2003. It included the popular single "Leben... I Feel You", featuring Peter Heppner. Artists like Peter Heppner (from Wolfsheim), Maya Saban, Sarah Brightman, Alexander Veljanov (from Deine Lakaien), Kim Sanders, and Mila Mar performed vocals on this album.

Leben was followed by Tag und Nacht (Day and Night), released on 28 October 2005. Mike Oldfield, Moya Brennan, Kim Sanders, Jette von Roth, and Thomas D. collaborated on it.

Schiller's fifth album, Sehnsucht (Desire) was announced in December 2007 and later released on 22 February 2008. Sehnsucht was simultaneously released in two formats and in three editions. Over 100,000 copies of Sehnsucht have been sold since the release of the album. It has received a golden certification. Sehnsucht was internationally released under the name Desire on 26 May 2008.

Schiller also collaborated with Colbie Caillat on "You" which was released in 2008, both of them appear in the accompanying video. Same year Schiller produced another successful single called "Time For Dreams" with the Chinese pianist Lang Lang. The song was used by the German TV channel ZDF during the 2008 Olympic games in Beijing.

Schiller's sixth studio album, Atemlos (Breathless), was released on 12 March 2010. It debuted on second position on German Charts and was the highest entry for a domestic album for the week. The English edition of the album Atemlos reached until number 3 in the chart of IFPI in Greece. The single "Try" featured Nadia Ali.

On 5 October 2012, the seventh studio album, Sonne (Sun), was released. The next album was Opus, issued on 30 August 2013.On 26 February 2016 Future saw its release. Schiller's tenth studio album, Morgenstund, was released on 22 March 2019. It included a couple of tracks with cooperation with Iranian artists.

In 2017, Schiller made history by making first electronic musical concert in Tehran, Iran.

In 2021, Schiller teamed up with Alphaville and released a new version of their "Summer in Berlin" song (from the Forever Young album) as Schiller x Alphaville.

Music licensing 
Maserati has used three of Schiller's songs: "Drifting and Dreaming" with Jette von Roth for their promotional video of the Maserati GranTurismo, "Sommernacht" (Summer Night) for their video on the GranTurismo S high performance version, and "Let Me Love You" with Kim Sanders for their Quattroporte high performance sedan.

In 2002, Jaguar produced a promotional DVD for the S Type and set it to the track 'Ein schöner Tag' (A beautiful day) by Schiller.

Discography 

The original German releases are under various subsidiaries of Universal Music Group, such as Polydor Records Germany. In the U.S., Schiller has been signed to several independent record labels, including Radikal Records for Zeitgeist, Voyage, and Life; 4 West Records for Day and Night; and OK! Good Records for Breathless.

Studio albums

German releases 
English translation in parentheses.
 1999 – Zeitgeist (Spirit of the Time)
 2001 – Weltreise (Voyage)
 2003 – Leben (Life)
 2005 – Tag und Nacht (Day and Night)
 2008 – Sehnsucht (Desire)
 2010 – Atemlos (Breathless) (2xCD) (GER: #4)
 2012 – Sonne (Sun)
 2013 – Opus
 2016 – Future
 2019 – Morgenstund (Early Morning)
 2020 – Colors (as Christopher von Deylen)
 2021 – Summer in Berlin
 2021 – Berlin Moskau: The Ultimate Experience
 2021 – Epic
 2023 – Illuminate

All albums received special edition release alongside standard release.

USA releases 
 2001 – Zeitgeist
 2002 – Voyage
 2004 – Life
 2005 – Prologue (previously Germany concert sales only)
 2007 – Day and Night
 2011 – Breathless (US version includes Desire)
 2013 – Sun

Extended plays 
 2010 – Lichtblick EP (Ray of Hope)

Live albums 
 2004 – Live Erleben (Live Experience)
 2006 – Tagtraum (Daydream)
 2008 – Sehnsucht Live
 2010 – Atemlos Live
 2013 – Sonne Live
 2014 – Symphonia
 2016 – Zeitreise

Singles

German releases 
 1998 – Das Glockenspiel (The Glockenspiel)
 1999 – Liebesschmerz (Lover's Pain)
 1999 – Ruhe (Calm)
 2000 – Ein Schöner Tag (A Beautiful Day) (with Isgaard)
 2001 – Dream of You (with Peter Heppner)
 2001 – Dancing With Loneliness (with Kim Sanders)
 2003 – Liebe (with Mila Mar) (Love)
 2004 – Leben... I Feel You (with Peter Heppner)
 2004 – I've Seen It All (with Maya Saban) (1 Track Promo Release Only)
 2004 – The Smile (with Sarah Brightman) (1 Track Promo Release Only)
 2005 – Die Nacht... Du Bist Nicht Allein (with Thomas D.) (The Night... You Are Not Alone)
 2006 – Der Tag... Du Bist Erwacht (with Jette von Roth) (The Day... You Are Awake)
 2008 – Sehnsucht (with Xavier Naidoo) (Desire) (1 Track Promo Release Only)
 2008 – Let Me Love You (with Kim Sanders)
 2008 – Time For Dreams (with Lang Lang)
 2008 – You (with Colbie Caillat)
 2010 – Try (with Nadia Ali)
 2010 – I Will Follow You (with Hen Ree) (Release: 11 June)
 2010 – Always You / Innocent Lies (with Anggun) (Release: 12 November)
 2012 – Sonne (with Unheilig) (Release: 21 September) (Sun)
 2013 – Lichtermeer (Release: 8 March) (Sleepless)
 2013 – Swan Lake (Release: 30 August)
 2016 – Paradise (with Arlissa) (Release: 12 February)
 2018 – Berlin Tehran
 2019 – Morgenstund (with Nena) (Release: 22 February)
 2019 — Universe
 2019 — In Between
 2019 — Avalanche
 2019 — Das Goldene Tor
 2020 — Avalanche 2020
 2020 — Infinity (as Christopher von Deylen)
 2020 — Arco Iris (as Christopher von Deylen)
 2020 — Heaven Can Wait (as Christopher von Deylen)
 2020 — Der Goldene Engel
 2021 — Metropolis
 2021 — Miracle
 2021 — Summer In Berlin
 2021 — Beyond The Horizon
 2021 — White Nights (Don't Let Me Go)
2021 — Midnight in Shiraz

USA releases 
 2000 – Das Glockenspiel / The Bell
 2002 – Dream of You (with Peter Heppner)
 2005 – I Feel You (with Peter Heppner & Kristian Djunited Hansson)
 2007 – Tired of Being Alone (with Tarja Turunen)
 2008 – Porque Te Vas (with Ana Torroja)
 2008 – Forever (with Kim Sanders)
 2008 – Breathe (with September)
 2008 – You (with Colbie Caillat)
 2011 – I feel You (with Kristian Djunited Hansson and Nadia Ali)

UK releases 
 2000 – Das Glockenspiel #79
 2001 – Ruhe #126
 2001 – Das Glockenspiel (DJ Tiesto remix) #17

Video

German releases 
 2001 – Weltreise – Die DVD
 2004 – Leben – Die DVD
 2004 – Live Erleben (live DVD)
 2006 – Tagtraum (double DVD + audio CD)
 2008 – Sehnsucht Live (double DVD)
 2010 – Lichtblick (double DVD)
 2013 – Sonne Live
 2014 – Symphonia
 2019 – Live In Tehran

USA releases 
 2002 – Voyage – The DVD
 2004 – Life (special editions of the album contained an amended, translated version of the DVD "Leben").
 2007 – Day and Night Live

Charitable releases 
 2005 – A Future for the Michel – Moya Brennan & Schiller

Mixes & Remixes 
 1999 – Sunbeam – Outside World [Schiller Remix]
 1999 – Supanova – Don't Break My Heart [Schiller Vocal Remix] & [Schiller Instrumental Remix]
 1999 – Trance Allstars – The First Rebirth [Schiller Club Mix] & [Schiller Edit]
 2000 – Trance Allstars – Ready To Flow [Schiller Club Mix] & [Schiller Edit]
 2000 – Tyrell Corp – Running 2.0 [Schiller Remix]
 2000 – U 96 – Das Boot 2001 [Schiller Remix]
 2002 – Apoptygma Berzerk – Until The End of the World [Schiller Remix]
 2002 – ATB – Let U Go [Schiller Remix]
 2002 – Gregorian feat. Sarah Brightman – Join Me [Schill Out Version by Schiller]
 2002 – Sinead O'Connor – Troy [Schiller Airplay Edit], [Schill Out Remix], & [Schiller Club Mix]
 2002 – Trance Allstars – Lost in Love [Schiller Mix] & [Schiller Radio Mix]
 2003 – Mesh – Friends Like These [Schiller Remix]
 2003 – Moya Brennan – Show Me [Schiller Edit] & [Schiller X/Tended Remix]
 2003 – Mila Mar – Sense of Being [Chill Out Remix by Schiller]
 2004 – Rammstein – Ohne Dich [Schiller Remix]
 2005 – Marianne Rosenberg – Er gehört zu mir [Schiller Remix]
 2008 – Bernstein – Paradies (Schiller Remix)
 2008 – Klaus Schulze und Lisa Gerrard – Liquid Coincidence 2 [Schiller Remix]
 2009 – Polarkreis 18 – Allein Allein [Schiller Remix]
 2011 – Andrea Corr – Pale Blue Eyes [Schiller Remix]
 2014 – Udo Jürgens – Ich weiß, was ich will (Schiller Remix)

References

External links 
 Official website
 
 Review Atemlos live
 

Ambient music groups
German trance musicians
Musical groups established in 1998
1998 establishments in Germany